Gedinne is a municipality of Wallonia located in the province of Namur, Belgium. 

On 1 January 2006 the municipality had 4,405 inhabitants.

It is situated in the Ardennes east of Meuse valley. The western limit of the municipality is the French border.

The municipality consists of the town of Gedinne and eleven villages:
(number of inhabitants in brackets)
 Gedinne (1,124, administrative centre)
 Bourseigne-Neuve (137)
 Bourseigne-Vieille (106)
 Houdremont (233)
 Louette-Saint-Denis (331)
 Louette-Saint-Pierre (270)
 Malvoisin (298)
 Patignies (242)
 Rienne (736)
 Sart-Custinne (169)
 Vencimont (499)
 Willerzie	(319)

See also
 List of protected heritage sites in Gedinne
 Tour du Millénaire, a remarkable timber and steel observation tower, built in 2001.

References

External links
 
Official website (in French)

Municipalities of Namur (province)